Figure skating events for men, women, and mixed pairs were held at the 1987 Pan American Games.

Men's events

Women's events

Mixed events

Events at the 1987 Pan American Games
1987 Pan American Games
Pan American Games